Bahia Hariri (born 23 June 1952) is a Lebanese politician and sister of former Lebanese Prime Minister Rafik Hariri.

Early life and education
Bahia Hariri was born in Sidon, Lebanon, on 23 June 1952 to a Sunni Muslim family. Her two brothers are Shafic and Rafik Hariri. She graduated from the Teacher Training College in Sidon.

Career
Hariri worked as a teacher upon graduation in Sidon and southern Lebanon until 1979. She then headed the Hariri Foundation in Sidon, founded by her brother Rafik Hariri in 1979. The foundation is a major educational and charitable institution.

In 1992, Hariri was elected as member of Parliament for the Sunni seat in Saida. She was reelected in 1996 and 2000 for the same seat. From July 2008 to November 2009 she was the minister of education.

She was again elected to Parliament in June 2009. She headed the Parliamentary commission for education and culture in the Lebanese Parliament, in addition to being member of the Parliamentary commission for foreign and immigration affairs. She is also a goodwill ambassador for UNESCO, and heads the Islamic Organization for Higher Education. She  serves on the Advisory Council of World Links Arab Region.

Personal life
Bahia Hariri is married to her cousin Mustafa Hariri. They married in 1973 and have four children: Nader (born 1976), Ghena (born 1979), Ahmad (born 1983) and Ola (1988).

Awards and distinctions
 Légion d'honneur (2003)

 The Aga Khan Award for Architecture, in recognition for the reconstruction of The Big Omary Mosque (1989)

 Lebanese Cedar Award, Lieutenant rank, in recognition for services in Social and Cultural fields (1989)

 The Golden Apple Award from the World Federation of Travel Journalists and Writers

 Honorary Doctorate from the American University of Science and Technology (2010)

References

External links

 Heyer, H. (8 August 2008). Executive Talk: Bahia Baha’a Elddine Hariri.
 NNA (10 October 2011). Hariri waiting for Mikati to fulfill his promises.
 IWSAW (2012). Who Is She In Lebanon. LAU.

1952 births
Living people
Bahia
People from Sidon
Lebanese American University
Members of the Parliament of Lebanon
Lebanese Sunni Muslims
Education ministers of Lebanon
Women government ministers of Lebanon
UNESCO Goodwill Ambassadors
21st-century Lebanese women politicians
21st-century Lebanese politicians
Future Movement politicians